Hasthampatti is a locality in Salem city in Tamil Nadu state, India. Hastampatti is one of the zones in Salem City Municipal Corporation, And part of Salem Metropolitan Area .

Hasthampatti Pin code is 636007 and postal head office is Salem North.

Areas nearby Hastampatti 
Alagapuram, Arun Nagar, Rajarajan Nagar, MDS Nagar, Ponnandigounder Nagar, Subbarayan Layout are the nearby Localities to Hasthampatti.

Polling station nearby Hastampatti 
 Cluny Matriculation School , Pudur Extension.
 CSI Hober School Hasthampatty Salem-636007.
 CSI Hober School Hasthampatty Salem-636007.
 CSI Hober School Hasthampatty Salem-636007.
 CSI Polytechnic College Yercaud Main Road Salem-636007.

Health center nearby Hastampatti 
 Shanmuga Hospital Cancer Ins, 24, Saradha College Road, Shanmuga Hospital Complex.
 Salem Gopi Hospital, 23b, Ramakrishna Road.
 Sims Chellum Hospital, 31/3C, Vijayaragavachariyar Road, off Gandhi Road.

Educational institutions nearby Hastampatti 
 World Tamil classical University
 CSI polytechnical college.
 Knowledge eduventure.
 VSR catering technology and management.
 Vasavi primary school.
 CSC computer education.
 NSEIT LIMITED.
 LEF Eden Garden Matriculation School.
 Kidzee Salem.
The Indian Public Kids School.

See also 
 Salem metro
 Salem metropolitan area (India)
 Alagapuram (Salem)
 Tamilnadu State Transport corporation Salem
 Local bodies in Salem
 Salem Central Prison

References

Salem, Tamil Nadu
Neighbourhoods in Salem, Tamil Nadu